The Canadian Injured Workers Alliance (CIWA) is a Canadian charity and advocacy organization for injured workers and occupational rehabilitation.   Active in providing training, educational resources, and advocacy both federally and provincially, it is based on a national network of injured workers groups whose aim is to support injured workers and improve the occupational health and safety of workers across Canada. CIWA's stated objectives include:
 improving the occupational health and safety of workers in Canada.
 working towards a just system of compensation, rehabilitation and re-employment in all provinces and territories of Canada.
 providing a national forum for debating issues of concern to injured workers and their organizations at national conferences and at national board workshops.
 gathering and share information with groups and individuals across Canada.

The organization was founded in 1990 by Steve Mantis and other injured workers advocates including Wolfgang Zimmermann, after they organized a "National Conference on Re-Employment of Injured Workers" in Ottawa in June 1990. The conference passed a resolution to form a national organization representing a national network of injured worker organizations, ultimately to become CIWA.

See also
 Workers' compensation
 Occupational rehabilitation

References

External links
 Canadian Injured Workers Alliance

Health charities in Canada
Political advocacy groups in Canada